The 2022 season was the 44th season of Creighton University fielding a men's varsity soccer team. It was the program's 10th season in the Big East Conference, and their fifth season with Johnny Torres as the head coach of the program. Creighton played their home matches at Morrison Stadium in Omaha, Nebraska.

Creighton finished the regular season 6–4–6 before going on a seven-match winning-streak that involved winning their first Big East men's soccer tournament ever, and their first soccer conference tournament championship since winning the Missouri Valley Conference men's soccer tournament in 2012. It also the first season since 2012 that the Bluejays reached the College Cup of the NCAA Division I men's soccer tournament, being unseeded and defeated three seeded programs en route to the College Cup. There, they were eliminated by Syracuse University, losing the game 2–3.

Duncan McGuire lead the entire NCAA in goals scored during the 2022 season, scoring 22 goals.

Background

Roster

Squad

Coaching staff

Schedule 

|-
!colspan=6 style=""| Preseason

|-
!colspan=6 style=""| Non-conference regular season
|-

|-
!colspan=6 style=""| Big East regular season
|-

|-
!colspan=6 style=""| 
|-

|-
!colspan=6 style=""| 
|-

Rankings

References

External links 
 Creighton Men's Soccer

2022
2022 Big East Conference men's soccer season
American men's college soccer teams 2022 season
2022 in sports in Nebraska
2022 NCAA Division I Men's Soccer Tournament participants
2022